This list of American films of 1938 compiles American feature films that were released in 1938.

The comedy You Can't Take It with You won the Academy Award for Best Picture.

A

B

C

D

E

F

G

H

I

J

K

L

M

N

O

P

R

S

T

U

V

W

Y

See also
 1938 in the United States

References

External links

1938 films at the Internet Movie Database

1938
Lists of 1938 films by country or language
Films